Peter Martyn (19 October 1925 – 15 February 1955) was a British actor and TV presenter. He hosted the UK version of the U.S. game show The Name's the Same in 1954, and the game show Find the Link in 1954-55.

He also acted in the original  Broadway production of Terence Rattigan's Harlequinade, in 1949.

Films and television series in which he appeared included:
 The Devil's Pass (1957)
 No Smoking (1955)
Mad About Men (1954)
Orders Are Orders (1954)
 Child's Play (1954)
 You Know What Sailors Are (1954)
 The Intruder (1953)
 Folly to Be Wise (1953)
 The Happy Family (1952)
 Lady Godiva Rides Again (1951)
 Appointment with Venus (1951)
 Studio One (1950 television series)

References

External links

1925 births
1955 deaths
English male stage actors
English male film actors
English male television actors
Male actors from London
20th-century English male actors
English television presenters
British television presenters
Deaths from cancer in England